Living Your Life is the third and final studio album from British new wave musician Belouis Some. It was released in Germany in 1993.

Background
Living Your Life was Belouis Some's first studio album in six years, and would also be his last. After finding differing levels of commercial success with the albums Some People (1985) and Belouis Some (1987), Belouis Some decided to form a band. In 1989 he formed The Big Broadcast, and the band toured the UK playing small venues and clubs. However the group never made any recorded releases. Living Your Life was recorded after a long absence. The album, as described by Allmusic, blended contemporary pop with harder-edged techno. The album was produced for Kickstart Music Ltd, and recorded at Marcus Recording Studios in London, between February–April 1993. It was mastered at Transfermation, and produced in London by Geoff Dugmore and Nigel Butler (although "Sometimes" and "Total Control" were both produced by Robin Goodfellow). Some musicians appearing on the album included Karl Hyde, Steve Barnacle, Peter Oxendale, and J.J. Belle.

Belouis Some solely wrote six of the album tracks. Peter Oxendale co-wrote "Sometimes" with him, and Dugmore and Butler co-wrote "Wonderful Life" with Belouis Some. The album's closing track, "Total Control", is a cover of the 1979 song by the Motels, written by Jeff Jourard and Martha Davis.

The album, released in Germany only, was not a commercial success. It did spawn two singles, but they were also commercial failures. "Something She Said", the lead single, was released by Arista and BMG in the UK and Germany. "Sometimes" was released by Some Music LTD and BMG in the UK and Germany as the second single. In addition to these two singles, a promotional CD single was released by BMG Ariola to promote the album. "Living Your Life" was the featured track, and three other album tracks were included. Belouis Some would not release any new material after the album, except for one single in 1995. This was "Let Me Love You for Tonight", released in the UK only.

Release
The album was issued via BMG Ariola München GmbH on CD in Germany only. The CD remains out-of-print today, and the album itself has not been made available as an official MP3 download.

Track listing

Critical reception

In the Billboard magazine of 30 July 1994, one article under the Dance Trax section mentioned the album and the single "Sometimes". Writer Larry Flick stated, "Belouis Some is out to prove that there is life beyond mid-'80s dance/pop stardom. "Sometimes" [is] a dark and jangly mover. Some's voice has developed a worldly edge to his intelligent lyrics. "Sometimes" is an enticing peek into Living Your Life, an album that gingerly walks the line between hardcore dance and smooth urban pop. Among the standouts are the languid "Birthday in Paradise" and the stomping "New World". Open your mind and give a listen." Music & Media wrote: "This British new rock artist returns to the scene with possibly his strongest effort to date. Strong melodies abound, as well as imaginative and energetic arrangements."

In a review of the album's lead single "Something She Said", Andrew Hirst of the Huddersfield Daily Examiner commented, "We haven't heard from this chap for a while. The 60s psychedelia swagger is punctuated by some incisive guitar work. It all works rather well."

Personnel
 Belouis Some – lead vocals
 Geoff Dugmore – producer, mixing, arranger, backing vocals, drums and programming (tracks 1, 3 to 8), additional producer (track 2)
 Nigel Butler – producer, mixing, arranger, backing vocals and programming (tracks 1, 3 to 8), additional producer (track 2), keyboards (tracks 2, 9)
 Robin Goodfellow – producer (tracks 2, 9), keyboards (tracks 2, 9)
 Tim Russell – engineer (tracks 1, 3 to 8), mixing
 Tim Hunt – engineer (tracks 2, 9)
 Trippy Guru Mamas – backing vocals (tracks 1, 3 to 8)
 Candy McKenzie – backing vocals (tracks 2, 9)
 Patti Layne – backing vocals (tracks 2, 9)
 Karl Hyde – guitar (tracks 1, 3 to 8)
 J.J. Belle – guitars (tracks 2, 9)
 Phil Bishop – guitars (tracks 2, 9)
 Steve Barnacle – bass (tracks 1, 3 to 8)
 Jeremy Allom – keyboards (tracks 2, 9), programming (tracks 2, 9)
 Toby Anderson – keyboards (tracks 2, 9), programming (tracks 2, 9)
 Chris Quayle – sleeve design
 Kate Martin – photography

References

1993 albums
Belouis Some albums
Bertelsmann Music Group albums